Czeszewo may refer to:

 Czeszewo, Wągrowiec County, Poland
 Czeszewo, Września County, Poland